"How Will I Know" is a song recorded by American singer Whitney Houston for her self-titled debut studio album. The song was released on November 22, 1985, by Arista Records as the album's third single. Originally written and composed by George Merrill and Shannon Rubicam, the song was originally intended for R&B singer Janet Jackson, but she passed on it. Houston then recorded the song with altered lyrics and production from Narada Michael Walden. The lyrics speak about the protagonist trying to discern if a boy she likes will ever like her back.

"How Will I Know" received mostly positive reviews from music critics. It became Houston's second number-one single on the US Billboard Hot 100 in February 1986, spending two weeks atop the chart and also became her first chart topper on the Canadian RPM Top 100 Singles chart. It also reached top 10 positions in Australia, Sweden, Ireland, Norway and the United Kingdom, and top 20 positions in the Netherlands, New Zealand and Switzerland.

The accompanying music video for "How Will I Know" features scenes of Houston dancing in a setting of video screens and colored partitions. The music video gave Houston exposure to the teenagers and MTV. It received two nominations at the 1986 MTV Video Music Awards; Best Female Video and Best New Artist, winning the former category. The song was performed on many of her tours including Greatest Love Tour (1986) and her Nothing but Love World Tour (2009–10). "How Will I Know" is also featured as a remix on Houston's compilation album Whitney: The Greatest Hits (2000), whereas the original single version is featured on The Ultimate Collection (2007) and I Will Always Love You: The Best of Whitney Houston (2012).

Background and recording
Initially, songwriters George Merrill and Shannon Rubicam had written the song's demo in 1984 for R&B singer Janet Jackson, employed by A&M Records executive, John McClain. However, after hearing the song, Jackson's management passed on the song, feeling it was too weak in comparison to her other material. In an interview with Fred Bronson, Merrill expressed his feelings after learning of Jackson's decision. "We were pretty upset because we thought it was perfect for her at the time. We had written it with her completely in mind." During this period, Brenda Andrews, at Almo-Irving Music, Merrill and Rubicam's publisher, played the song for Gerry Griffith, the director for R&B music at A&M and Arista Records. Griffith, who was compiling material for Houston's debut album at the time, felt the song perfectly matched her sound. He soon contacted Andrews and the song's two writers and prompted that they should give up the song to him for Houston's debut album. Griffith described his discovery of the song and what he and Clive Davis thought of it:

"We had a lot of R&B-based tunes, we had a few ballads, but we didn't have a pop crossover song. So when I heard 'How Will I Know,' I said 'this is absolutely perfect.' I played it for Clive [and] he fell in love with it. I wasn't very familiar with her family background; I didn't realize that, even at that time, there was a pretty big industry buzz about her future."

After getting permission to use the song from Merrill, Griffith quickly turned to Narada Michael Walden, who was producing for Aretha Franklin, material for her album Who's Zoomin' Who?, at the time. After getting in touch with Walden, Griffith frantically prompted him to produce the song, describing how important the song would be for Houston's upcoming album. After hearing the song's demo, Walden agreed to fly down to San Rafael, California to arrange it. He was not much impressed with the demo and requested permission to change some of the song's lyrics and chord progression. Distracted by his request, Merrill and Rubicam denied him the right to their song. After a lot of back-and-forth with Griffith, they compromised and allowed Walden to de-construct the song and change the key and tempo. After completing the song, Houston came into the studio to record her vocals in late 1984. Cissy Houston, Whitney's mother, joined her daughter to perform the song's background vocals.  Griffith stated:
"I asked Whitney to sing on the background session. She was reluctant because she wanted to enjoy hearing her mother sing. I said, 'No, get out there and sing,' so she did. The background sounded incredible...Clive Davis heard the mix and immediately gave it a 10, which is outrageous for him, because he doesn't like anything!"

The tenor saxophone is played by Premik Russell Tubbs.

Composition

"How Will I Know" is a synth-funk and dance-pop song composed in a 1980s dance beat. According to Kyle Anderson of MTV, the song found Houston hitting an "incredible groove". It is written in the key of G flat major. The beat is set the time signature of common time and moves at a fast tempo of 120 beats per minute. The song also has the sequence of G-Bm7-G/C-D-Em-D as its chord progression. Houston's vocals in the song span from the note of D4 to the high note of G5. Lyrically, the song speaks about the lead woman trying to discern whether a man she likes will ever like her back. She is also hesitant, because her friends tell her "love can be deceiving", and she is so shy that she cannot call him. Later, she feels that it might be a dream, but realizes that "there's no mistaking", and that what she feels is really love.

Critical reception
"How Will I Know" mainly garnered positive reviews from music critics, with some noting it as a standout on the album. Don Shewey of Rolling Stone commented "Although it's awfully reminiscent of the Pointer Sisters' 'He's So Shy', 'How Will I Know' is still irresistibly danceable." Stephen Thomas Erlewine of AllMusic wrote "...what really impresses some 20-plus years on are the lighter tracks, particularly the breakthrough single 'How Will I Know'." While reviewing the Deluxe Anniversary Edition of the album, Mikael Wood of Entertainment Weekly commented on the a cappella version of the song noting, "a cappella mix of 'How Will I Know' [that] displays the singer's precision long before the advent of Auto-Tune." While reviewing The Ultimate Collection, Nick Levine of Digital Spy added, "Houston's floor-fillers have aged a little more gracefully, although their clunky, thudding drum sounds are as unmistakably eighties as Joan Collins' Dynasty wardrobe." The song was voted number 12 in VH1's List of Greatest Songs of the 1980s.

Commercial performance
"How Will I Know" debuted at number 60 on the US Billboard Hot 100, on the December 7, 1985 issue. Nine weeks later, it peaked at number one on the issue dated February 15, 1986, becoming Houston's second number-one single on that chart. It displaced Houston's cousin Dionne Warwick's "That's What Friends Are For", and was displaced by Mr. Mister's "Kyrie". It stayed on the peak for two weeks. The single also debuted on the Billboard Hot Black Singles chart at number 60 and later peaked at number one, a peak it maintained for one week. On the issue dated January 25, 1986, "How Will I Know" entered the Billboard Dance Club Songs chart at number 30 and later peaked at number three on the February 22, 1986 issue. It also peaked at number one on the Billboard Adult Contemporary chart. The Recording Industry Association of America (RIAA) certified the single Gold on December 6, 1985, for shipments of 500,000 copies or more, and later Double Platinum, for an equivalent sales of 2,000,000 units. It ranked at number six on the Billboard year-end chart. In Canada, the single debuted at number 80 on the RPM Top 100 Singles chart on the issue dated December 14, 1985. It later peaked at number one on the week dated March 1, 1986, becoming Houston's first number-one single in Canada. It was later certified Gold by the Canadian Recording Industry Association (CRIA) on May 1, 1986, for shipments of 200,000 copies or more.

The single performed well in other countries. In United Kingdom, it debuted at number 36, during the week of January 25, 1986 and later peaked at a position of number five. It was also certified Silver by the British Phonographic Industry (BPI). According to MTV UK and Ireland, the single has sold about 280,000 copies in the United Kingdom. In New Zealand, the single debuted at number 35 and later peaked at number 19. In Austria, the single reached a peak position of number 28, while reaching a peak of number 12 in the Netherlands. It also reached number two in Norway and Sweden, while charting at number 11 in Switzerland. According to AllMusic, "How Will I Know" has sold about 1.5 million copies worldwide.

In Australia, "How Will I Know" was released as the first single from the album in March 1985. It spent a single week in the Kent Music Report chart at number 97 in July 1985, before re-entering the chart in February 1986, eventually peaking at number two.

Music video
The accompanying music video for "How Will I Know", directed by British director Brian Grant and choreographed by Arlene Phillips, was filmed before the release of the single and album. Unlike her past music videos, Houston was given the opportunity to move beyond the staged performance settings to demonstrate straightforward dance moves. The music video is set against a strikingly designed, vividly colored setting of video screens and partitions. Houston's hair is dyed honey blonde and is worn by a dazzling colored hairbow. She is also seen underlined by a form-fitting silver dress made of metal mesh, reaching almost to her knees, adorned with matching fingerless gloves. Houston is also seen reaching out with backup dancers, in black outfits and wearing French-style makeup. The music video also has a scene of splattering of paint and drizzling down the screen. Houston's labelmate and family friend Aretha Franklin also makes a black-and-white cameo appearance in the otherwise colourful music video. In 2011, Kyle Anderson of MTV wrote that the video was "eye-opening to watch her cut loose in a fun environment", since her past songs were ballads.

The music video was her first to receive heavy rotation on MTV. Also, the music video was nominated for two awards at the 1986 MTV Video Music Awards, in the categories of Best New Artist and Best Female Video, winning the latter.

Live performances

Houston performed the song on her Greatest Love Tour (1986), Moment of Truth World Tour (1987–88), Feels So Right Japan Tour (1990), I'm Your Baby Tonight World Tour (1991), The Bodyguard World Tour (1993–94), My Love Is Your Love World Tour (1999) and Nothing but Love World Tour (2009–2010). Apart from the concert tour performances, Houston has performed the song on many other occasions like the third annual MTV Video Music Awards in 1986, where she sang "How Will I Know" and "Greatest Love of All", 13th annual American Music Awards (1986), and 1987 BRIT Awards. The latter performance is included in the 2014 CD/DVD release, Whitney Houston Live: Her Greatest Performances.
On May 15, 1987, during her European promotion for then-new album, Whitney, Houston sang the song at the Montreux Golden Rose Rock Festival: IM&MC Gala with two other 1986 released songs, "I Wanna Dance with Somebody (Who Loves Me)" and "Where Do Broken Hearts Go". On April 29, 1985, she appeared on The Merv Griffin Show, taped in New York City, and performed "How Will I Know". On her Moment of Truth World Tour, she participated in the Nelson Mandela 70th Birthday Tribute Concert and performed the song with other seven songs. She also performed the song on "Welcome Home Heroes", a concert dedicated to the U.S. troops, their families, and military and government dignitaries in honor of those returning from the Gulf War, which aired on HBO on March 31, 1991. The concert was taped and later released as a VHS on May 14, 1991. She also performed the song on The Concert for a New South Africa, three concerts in 1994 to honor President Nelson Mandela. Houston later performed the song on the closing ceremonies of the 1994 World Cup along with five of her other songs. In 2000, she performed the song on Arista's 25th Anniversary, along with "I Wanna Dance with Somebody (Who Loves Me)".

Track listing and formats

US 7" Vinyl Single
A "How Will I Know (edit)" – 4:10
B "Someone for Me" – 4:57
German 12" Vinyl Single
A "How Will I Know" (dance remix) – 6:35
B1 "How Will I Know" (instrumental version) – 4:42
B2 "How Will I Know" (LP version) – 4:28
German 12" Vinyl Single
A "How Will I Know" (dance mix) – 6:10
B1 "Saving All My Love for You" – 3:55
B2 "How Will I Know" (dub mix) – 5:36
Japan CD Single/3"
 "How Will I Know" – 4:34
 "Someone for Me" – 5:00

Credits and personnel

"How Will I Know"
George Merrill – writer
Shannon Rubicam – writer
Narada Michael Walden – writer, vocal producer
Whitney Houston – lead vocals
Mary Canty – background vocals
Preston Glass – synthesizer
Cissy Houston – background vocals
Randy Jackson – bass
Yvonne Lewis – keyboards
Corrado Rustici – guitar
Premik Russell Tubbs – saxophone
Bill Schnee – mixer, Firewire synth trumpet, drums
Michael Barbiero – engineer

"Someone for Me"
Freddie Washington – writer
Raymond Jones – writer
Jermaine Jackson – vocal producer, duet vocals
Whitney Houston – lead vocals
John Barnes – keyboards
Nathan East – bass
Ed Greene – drums
Paul Jackson, Jr. – guitar
Tim May – guitar
Greg Phillinganes – synthesizer
John "J.R." Robinson – drums
Steve Rucker – drums
Freddie Washington – bass
Bill Schnee – mixer

Charts and certifications

Weekly charts

Year-end charts

All-time charts

Certifications

David Guetta, MistaJam and John Newman version

In 2021, David Guetta teamed up with MistaJam and singer John Newman to release a dance track based on an interpolation of "How Will I Know". Now called "If You Really Love Me (How Will I Know)", the song charted in the UK, reaching No. 66 in the Top 75 (for the week ending August 5, 2021) after amassing a sales total of 7,018 units. The song became the fourth entry on that week's chart for Guetta (though the only single out of the four chart hits where he took lead artist credit) and the first chart credit for Newman since "Give Me Your Love" with Sigala and Nile Rodgers in 2016.

Charts

Weekly charts

Year-end charts

Certifications

Whitney × Clean Bandit version

Charts

Weekly charts

Certifications

Sam Smith version
English singer Sam Smith released a cover of "How Will I Know" in June 2014, taking a slower tempo and a snippet of that version was used in an episode of Grey's Anatomy. It was later included on Smith's 2015 In the Lonely Hour (Drowning Shadows Edition), a re-release of their debut album. It was certified gold in 2022 by the RIAA.

See also
List of RPM number-one singles of 1986
List of Hot 100 number-one singles of 1986 (U.S.)
List of number-one R&B singles of 1986 (U.S.)
List of number-one adult contemporary singles of 1986 (U.S.)

References

Bibliography

External links

1985 songs
1985 singles
1986 singles
2021 singles
Whitney Houston songs
Billboard Hot 100 number-one singles
Cashbox number-one singles
Clean Bandit songs
David Guetta songs
John Newman (singer) songs
MTV Video Music Award for Best Female Video
Number-one singles in Iceland
Songs written by Narada Michael Walden
Songs written by Shannon Rubicam
Songs written by George Merrill (songwriter)
RPM Top Singles number-one singles
Song recordings produced by Narada Michael Walden
Funk songs
Arista Records singles
Parlophone singles
Music videos shot in London